Artem Teplov (born 14 October 1992) is a Belarusian footballer.

In July 2020 Teplov was found guilty of being involved in a match-fixing schema in Belarusian football. He was sentenced to two years of community service and banned from Belarusian football for one year.

Honours
Naftan Novopolotsk
Belarusian Cup winner: 2011–12

References

External links
 
 
 Profile at Naftan website

1992 births
Living people
People from Navapolatsk
Belarusian footballers
Association football defenders
FC Naftan Novopolotsk players
FC Smorgon players
Sportspeople from Vitebsk Region